The 1979 Lamar Cardinals football team represented Lamar University as a member of the Southland Conference during the 1979 NCAA Division I-A football season. The Cardinals played their home games at Cardinal Stadium now named Provost Umphrey Stadium in Beaumont, Texas. Lamar finished the 1979 season with a 6–3–2 overall record and a 3–2 conference record. The 1979 season marked Larry Kennan's first season as Lamar's head football coach. The season also marked higher attendance at Cardinal Stadium. The second and fourth highest attended games were recorded in the season with 17,600 attending the game against the Louisiana Tech Bulldogs and 17,250 attending the game against the West Texas State Buffaloes.

Schedule

References

Lamar
Lamar Cardinals football seasons
Lamar Cardinals football